The 1909–10 Scottish Districts season is a record of all the rugby union matches for Scotland's district teams.

History

Edinburgh District beat Glasgow District in the Inter-City match

Results

Inter-City

Glasgow District:

Edinburgh District:

Other Scottish matches

Provinces:

Anglo-Scots: 

Cities:

Provinces:

English matches

South v London Scottish 27 November

International matches

No touring matches this season.

References

1909–10 in Scottish rugby union
Scottish Districts seasons